Jai Hanuman is a 1997 Indian television series based on the life of the Hindu deity Hanuman, an avatar of Shiva, in Hindi. It was directed by Sanjay Khan. The series was initially shown on the state-run DD National, and was later shown on Sony Entertainment Television in 2008.

Plot
In the Treta Yuga (2nd age), various events occur, including the defeat of demons by Lord Vishnu, which leads to the birth of positive and negative forces. One of the negative forces—the rise of demon dictator Ravana—plunges the universe into terror. The birth of God becomes necessary to eliminate the terror of Ravana, leading to the birth of two of the most powerful and mutually attached gods: Shri Rama and Hanuman, sons of Ayodhya's King Dashrath and the ape-headed King Kesari respectively. As time passes, the two meet and become close friends. Hanuman is a celibate monkey, dedicated friend, and brave warrior. Shri Ram is an ideal human being and an excellent warrior, whose love for Hanuman knows no bounds. Shri Ram asks Hanuman to perform worldly duties until the call of time. As time progresses, events described in Valmiki's Ramayan take place. During the war of Lanka, the war skills of human beings and monkeys (along with those of Shri Rama and Hanuman) lead to the end of demon warriors like Meghnad, Kumbhakarna, and Ravan. Shri Rama ultimately returns to Ayodhya, and Ramarajya comes into existence.

As time passes, friendship between Sri Rama and Hanuman grows, but after many dramatic events Shri Rama—along with his co-incarnated fellows Laxman, Sita, Shatrughna and Bharat—leaves Earth. They leave Hanuman alone to serve mankind. As time passes, the Dvapara Yuga (3rd age) arrives and Shri Rama, along with other incarnated souls, reincarnates as Shri Krishna to protect Dharma. Shri Krishna forms an alliance with Pandavas, the five Moral Brothers, against their 100 immoral cousins, the Kauravas. The third Pandava, Arjuna, is a friend and follower of Krishna. Shri Krishna makes Hanuman realise that he and his friend Shri Rama are the same, and asks him to support him in his mission Hanuman does so, and the events of Mahabharata take place. Before the war, Pandavas (on the advice of Shri Krishna) invokes Hanuman to help him in the upcoming war. Hanuman blesses them and takes a place in Arjuna's Chariot. The sermon of Bhagavad Geeta and the 18 Days Battle of Kurukshetra take place, leading to a victory for Dharma. Hanuman watches the bloodshed in silence. After many other dramatic events, the Dvapara Yuga ends and Shri Krishna leaves Earth.

As time passes, the Kali Yuga (4th age) arrives and all morality from Earth fades away. Hanuman takes the responsibility of sowing the seeds of Dharma along with spreading the fame of Sri Rama with the help of Goswami Tulsidas, who is the incarnation of Maharishi Valmiki. Goswami Tulsidas rewrites the Ramayana in the form of the Ramcharitmanas to help uplift the masses. Hanuman helps Goswami Tulsidas in every way, including helping to fade of the illusion of lust. Goswami Tulsidas and Hanuman are successful to some extent in their mission.

Tulsidas pleases Shri Rama and Lakshman and they give their Darshan, while Sita  gives Darshan to Ratna, his wife. After a long period Tulsidas leaves for Vaikunth, and Hanuman carries on the responsibility of sowing the seed of morality all by himself.

Cast

 Raj Premi as Hanuman, a great devotee of Lord Rama / Shiva, destroyer of the universe;Hanuman is his incarnation
 Kavin Dave as Child Hanuman / Child Raavan
 Siraj Mustafa Khan as Rama, 7th incarnation of Lord Vishnu
 Shilpa Mukherjee / Meenakshi Gupta as Sita, Rama's wife; Goddess Lakshmi's incarnation
 Manish Khanna as Lakshmana , Lord Rama's third brother / Arjuna
 Phalguni Parekh as Añjanā, Hanuman's mother
 Deepak Jethi as Kesari , Hanuman's father / Angada, Vali's son(for few episodes)
 Upasana Singh as Mohini
 Anil Varma / Premchand Sharma as Surya  
 Arup Pal as Indra, king of all gods
 Sharmilee Raj as Shachi, Indra Dev's wife
 Sagar Saini as Varuna, Hanuman's spiritual father
 Aseem Dixit as Agni
 Arif Khan as Angwahan
 Sunil Singh as Vishwamitra / Bhishma, granduncle of Pandavas
 Vijay Arun as  Vashishtha
 Tarun Kumar as Yagyavalkya
 Pradeep Sharma as Janaka, Sita's father
 Deep Dhillon as Dasharatha, Ram's father
 Riten Mukherjee /  Rahul Khetarpal as Bharata, Lord Rama's second brother
 Hitesh Kumar as Shatrughna, Lord Rama's youngest brother
 Monika / Malavika Shivpuri as Urmila, Sita's  sister, Lakshman's wife
 Raji Sharma / Gulrez Khan as Mandavi, Sita's cousin, Bharat's wife 
 Samreen Naaz / Anita Hassanandani as Shrutakirti, Sita's cousin, Shatrughan's wife
 Anil Yadav as Ravana, King of Lanka who abducted Sita
 Sonia Kapoor as Mahagauri , Goddess Gauri/  Ganga, a river in India
 Saba / Sonia Kapoor as Mandodari 
 Urmi Neqi /Jaya Mathur as Shurpanakha
 Arun Mathur as Shukracharya / Dhritrashtra, Father of Kauravas
 Brownie Parashar as Rahu / Mayasura / Sugriva, Vali's brother
 Anirudh Agarwal as Shambhrasur
Roma Manek as Kaushalya, Ram's mother
 Maya Alagh as Kaikeyi, Bharat's mother
 Mangala Kenkare as Sumitra, Lakshman and Shatrughan's mother
 Sunny Singh as Child Ram
 Deepak Beri as Child Lakshman
 Tanmay Narvekar as Child Bharat 
 Vinit Gadhia as Child Shatrughn 
 Sudhir Mittoo as Vishnu 
 Jaya Bhattacharya as Lakshmi
 Rohitash Gaud as Tulsidas
 Irrfan Khan / Sudhir Dalvi as Valmiki
 Mukesh Khanna as Bhagiratha, an ancestor of Lord Rama
 Chand Dhar as Sumali
 Anupam Shyam as Mali
 Sunil Bob Gadhavali as Malyavan
 Nimai Bali as Vayu / Vali / Duryodhana / Makardhwaja
 Raju Shrestha as Narada
Rishabh Shukla as Manu Maharaj
 Arun Bali as Vishrava
 Utkarsha Naik as Kaikasi
 Amit Pachori as Angada
 Deepraj Rana as Nagmuni / Vibhishana 
 Ritu Deepak as Sulochana
 Shamim Khan as Srimati Rajkumari 
 Kumar Hegde as Vindyas
 Narendra Jha as Kubera
 Ravi Kishan as Krishna
 Raman Khatri as Parshurama / Indrajeet 
 Govind Khatri as Gunasunder
 Ravi Chawala as Jatayu
 Mahendra Ghule as Kumbhakarna
 Shailendra Srivastav as Ahiravan
 Ramesh Tiwari as Mahiravana
 Kali Prasad Mukherjee as Shani / Kali
 Rahul Bhatt as Sujati
 Bhavesh Vora as Pragati
 Barkha Pandit as Punjiksthala
 Naveen Bawa as Priyadhar
 Sanjay Swaraj as Himavat
 Syed Badr-ul Hasan Khan Bahadur
 Kaushal Kapoor as Dushasana
 Vilas Raj as Kalanemi
 Vikrant Sokhi as Kuranjan, a minister of Sumali, Mali and Malyavan 
 Balwant Bansal as Matanga
 Saba as Menaka
 Shamim Khan as Rambha

Production
Created by Sanjay Khan, the series told the saga of Hanuman chronologically over 178 episodes. Jai Hanuman starred Raj Premi as Hanuman, Siraj Mustafa Khan as Shri Ram, Irrfan Khan as Maharishi Valmiki, and Manish Khanna as Lakshman. The series was produced by Sanjay Khan's production house, Numero Uno International, which had produced other series of his, including The Sword of Tipu Sultan (1989–1990) and The Great Maratha (1993).

References

External links
 

1997 Indian television series debuts
2000 Indian television series endings
DD Metro original programming
Television series based on the Ramayana